Sheepdog Glory is a novel written by Roy Saunders in 1956. It is a biography of Toss, a border collie herding dog owned by Saunders. The novel chronicles Toss's development from a puppy to a winner of the annual sheepdog trials.  It is set in the framework of a Welsh shepherd's calendar, and follows the mixed fortunes of the hill shepherd's daily life.

The novel was reprinted in 2009 by Outrun Press.

References

1956 British novels
André Deutsch books